Castle Air Museum is a military aviation museum located in Atwater, California, United States adjacent to Castle Airport, a former United States Air Force Strategic Air Command base which was closed in 1995, after the end of the Cold War. It is one of the largest aerospace museums displaying vintage aircraft in the western United States.

History and information
The museum opened with 12 aircraft on 20 June 1981 as a branch of the United States Air Force Museum system. Only four months later, an additional four aircraft were placed on display. Then in 1983, an audit criticized leadership for poor accountability of resources, displaying aircraft outside the museum's mission, and lack of security. When Castle Air Force Base was closed in April 1995 and became Castle Airport, the museum similarly became private. The loss of federal funding eventually caused financial problems for the museum.

It currently displays over 60 restored World War II, Korean War, Cold War, and modern era aircraft. An indoor museum features artifacts, photographs, uniforms, war memorabilia, aircraft engines, and a restored B-52 Stratofortress flight deck. A crew of volunteers restores and maintains the aircraft on display. The museum also hosts a periodic Open House in which visitors can view the interiors of certain planes.

In May 2008, the museum reached its 50th displayed aircraft milestone with the addition of a Douglas A-4L Skyhawk. The aircraft was shipped to the museum in August 2006, and restored at a cost of $12,000.

In October 2013, the Museum received a retired VC-9C aircraft that had previously served during several administrations as an alternate Air Force One and Air Force Two aircraft when use of the primary VC-137 or VC-25 was impractical. Vice presidents such as Al Gore and Dick Cheney, and First Ladies such as Nancy Reagan, Barbara Bush, and Hillary Clinton, as well as presidents Ronald Reagan and Bill Clinton, were among the individuals who used the plane.

In 2021, the museum received 5 aircraft from Naval Air Museum Barbers Point, which had closed two years prior.

Alleged paranormal occurrences
The B-29A Superfortress exhibit is reported to be haunted by a spirit named "Arthur." Museum management has reported that visitors, including paranormal investigators, have heard knocking and footsteps from inside the plane.  In addition, lights in the aircraft have been known to turn on and off, and the propellers are known to turn even though they are locked in place.  An apparition has allegedly been photographed on several occasions, and paranormal researchers claim to have detected anomalous readings on their equipment. The paranormal occurrences have been featured on an episode of UPN's Real Ghosts (1995).

Collection

Hidden aircraft collection
Castle Air Museum has several aircraft that cannot be displayed outdoors, as their fabric coverings do not hold up in the San Joaquin Valley weather. The museum is working to raise funds for a suitable building to display these and other items that they do not currently have indoor space to display.

Piper L-4
Stinson L-5 Sentinel
Bell H-13 Sioux
Ryan PT-22 Recruit
Fairchild PT-23
Schweizer SGS 1-26 (TG-3)
Cessna UC-78

Restoration efforts
The museum has recently received several aircraft which are currently under restoration before they will be displayed on the museum grounds:

Convair B-58 Hustler
Douglas SBD Dauntless
Lockheed EC-121 Warning Star
Lockheed PV-2 Harpoon

References

Footnotes

Notes

Bibliography

 Castle Air Museum Visitor's Guide
 City of Atwater – Approved Annexations

External links

Castle Air Museum website
SR-71 Online – Castle Air Museum Photo Tour
Castle Air Museum RB-36H Peacemaker

Aerospace museums in California
Museums in Merced County, California
Military and war museums in California
Museums established in 1981
1981 establishments in California